Cheng's jird (Meriones chengi)  is a species of rodent in the family Muridae. It was named in honour of the Chinese zoologist Professor Tso-hsin Cheng.
It is found only in the Turpan Depression of eastern Xinjiang, China.

References

Meriones (rodent)
Rodents of China
Mammals described in 1964
Endemic fauna of China
Taxonomy articles created by Polbot